Ananya Jahanara Kabir is an Indian literary scholar. She studied literature at the University of Calcutta and Cambridge University, and has taught at the University of Leeds and King's College London. She is the author of numerous research papers and she has published several books. Her prizes include the Infosys Prize (humanities, 2017) and the Humboldt Prize (2018).

Personal life

She belongs to the Kabir lineage of Calcutta and is thereby related to Humayun Kabir and Justice Altamas Kabir among others.

Works

References

Indian writers
Living people
Year of birth missing (living people)
University of Calcutta alumni
Alumni of the University of Cambridge
Academics of the University of Leeds
Academics of King's College London